Filthy is the third album by rapper-DJ, Egyptian Lover.  The album was released in 1988 for Priority Records and was produced by Egyptian Lover himself. The album was both a commercial and critical failure only making it to #99 on the Top R&B/Hip-Hop Albums chart and producing no hit singles.

Track listing
"D.S.L.'s"
"I Want Cha"
"Whisper in Your Ear"
"Overdose"
"Baddest Beats Around"
"I'm Thru with You"
"Planet E"
"Filthy"
"Green Onions"

References

Egyptian Lover albums
1988 albums
Albums produced by Egyptian Lover
Priority Records albums